Agrivoltaics, agrophotovoltaics, agrisolar, or dual-use solar is the simultaneous use of areas of land for both solar photovoltaic power generation and agriculture. The coexistence of solar panels and crops implies a sharing of light between these two types of production, so the design of agrivoltaic facilities may require trading off such objectives as optimizing crop yield, crop quality, and energy production. However, in some cases crop yield increases due to the shade of the solar panels mitigating some of the stress on plants caused by high temperatures and UV damage.

The technique was originally conceived by Adolf Goetzberger and Armin Zastrow in 1981, Agrivoltaics can refer to different methods of combining crops with solar panels, from conventional solar panels positioned on top of crops, to greenhouses made of semi-transparent PV panels.

Definition

Agrivoltaic practices and the relevant law vary from one country to another. In Europe and Asia, where the concept was first pioneered, the term agrivoltaics is applied to dedicated dual-use technology, generally a system of mounts or cables to raise the solar array some five metres above the ground in order to allow the land to be accessed by farm machinery, or a system where solar paneling is installed on the roofs of greenhouses. 

By 2019, some authors had begun using the term agrivoltaics more broadly, so as to include any agricultural activity among existing conventional solar arrays. As an example, sheep can be grazed among conventional solar panels without any modification. And some small projects in the United States where beehives are installed at the edge of an existing conventional solar array have been called agrivoltaic systems. Likewise, some conceive agrivoltaics so broadly as to include the mere installation of solar panels on the roofs of barns or livestock sheds.

System designs 

There are three basic types of agrivoltaics that are being actively researched: solar arrays with space between for crops, stilted solar arrays above crops, and greenhouse solar arrays. All three systems have several variables used to maximize solar energy absorbed in both the panels and the crops. The main variable taken into account for agrivoltaic systems is the tilt angle of the solar panels. Other variables taken into account for choosing the location of the agrivoltaic system are the crops chosen, panel heights, solar irradiance and climate of the area.

In their initial 1982 paper, Goetzberger and Zastrow published a number of ideas on how to optimise future agrivoltaic installations.

 orientation of solar panels in the south for fixed or east–west panels for panels rotating on an axis,
 spacing between solar panels for sufficient light transmission to ground crops,
 elevation of the supporting structure of the solar panels to homogenize the amounts of radiation on the ground.

Experimental facilities often have a control agricultural area. The control zone is exploited under the same conditions as the agrivoltaic device in order to study the effects of the device on the development of crops.

Fixed solar panels over crops 

The most conventional systems install fixed solar panels on agricultural greenhouses, above open fields crops or between open fields crops. It is possible to optimize the installation by modifying the density of solar panels or the inclination of the panels.

Vertical systems 
Vertically mounted agrivoltaic systems with bifacial photovoltaic modules systems have been developed. Most agricultural fences can be used for vertical agrivoltaics. Overall, at least one PV module between posts is acceptable for most fences for $0.035/kWh for racking on existing fencing in the U.S.; although the yield for a vertical PV is only 76% facing south, the racking cost savings enable fence-retrofit agrivoltaics to often produce lower levelized cost electricity. For fence PV, microinverters had better performance when the cross-over fence length was under 30 m or when the system was small, whereas string inverters were a better selection for longer fences. Simulation results show that the row distance between bifacial photovoltaic module structures significantly affects the photosynthetically active radiation distribution. Next2Sun has commercialized vertical agrivoltaic systems in Europe. Open-source vertical wood-based PV racking has been designed for farms that is (i) constructed from locally accessible (domestic) renewable and sustainable materials, (ii) able to be made with hand tools by the average farmer on site, (iii) possesses a 25-year lifetime to match PV warranties, and (iv) is structurally sound, following Canadian building codes to weather high wind speeds and heavy snow loads. The results showed that the capital cost of the racking system is less expensive than the commercial equivalent and all of the previous wood-based rack designs, at a single unit retail cost of CAD 0.21.

Integrated systems 
A standalone solar panel integrated system using a hydrogel can work as an atmospheric water generator, pulling in water vapor (usually at night) to produce fresh water to irrigate crops which can be enclosed beneath the panel (alternatively it can cool the panel).

Dynamic agrivoltaic 
The simplest and earliest system was built in Japan using a rather flimsy set of panels mounted on thin pipes on stands without concrete footings. This system is dismountable and lightweight, and the panels can be moved around or adjusted manually during the seasons as the farmer cultivates the land. The spacing between the solar panels is wide in order to reduce wind resistance.

Some newer agrivoltaic system designs use a tracking system to automatically optimize the position of the panels to improve agricultural production or electricity production.

In 2004 Günter Czaloun proposed a photovoltaic tracking system with a rope rack system. Panels can be oriented to improve power generation or shade crops as needed. The first prototype was built in 2007 in Austria. The company REM TEC deployed several plants equipped with dual-axis tracking systems in Italy and China. They have also developed an equivalent system used for agricultural greenhouses.

In France, Sun'R and Agrivolta companies are developing single-axis tracking systems. According to them, their systems can be adapted to the plant needs. The Sun'R system is east–west axis tracking system. According to the company, complex plant growth models, weather forecasts, calculation and optimization software are used. The device from Agrivolta is equipped with south-facing solar panels that can be removed by a sliding system. A Japanese company has also developed a tracking system to follow the sun.

In Switzerland, the company Insolight is developing translucent solar modules with an integrated tracking system that allows the modules to remain static. The module uses lenses to concentrate light onto solar cells and a dynamic light transmission system to adjust the amount of transmitted light and adapt to agricultural needs.

The Artigianfer company developed a photovoltaic greenhouse whose solar panels are installed on movable shutters. The panels can follow the course of the sun along an east–west axis.

In 2015 Wen Liu from the University of Science and Technology in Hefei, China, proposed a new agrivoltaic concept: curved glass panels covered with a dichroitic polymer film that selectively transmits blue and red wavelengths which are necessary for photosynthesis. All other wavelengths are reflected and concentrated on solar cells for power generation using a dual tracking system. Shadow effects arising from regular solar panels above the crop field are eliminated since the crops continue to receive the blue and red wavelength necessary for photosynthesis. Several awards have been granted for this new type of agrivoltaic, among others the R&D100 prize in 2017.

The difficulty of such systems is to find the mode of operation to maintain the good balance between the two types of production according to the goals of the system. Fine control of the panels to adapt shading to the need of plants requires advanced agronomic skills to understand the development of plants. Experimental devices are usually developed in collaboration with research centers.

Greenhouses with spectrally selective solar modules
Potential new photovoltaic technologies which let through the colors of light needed by the interior plants, but use the other wavelengths to generate electricity, might one day have some future use in greenhouses. There are prototypes of such greenhouses."Semi-transparent" PV panels used in agrivoltaics,increase the spacing between solar cells and use clear backsheets enhance food production below. In this option, the fixed PV panels enable the east–west movement of the sun to "spray sunlight" over the plants below.. thereby reducing "over-exposure" due to the day long sun.. as in transparent greenhouses... as they generate electricity above.

Grazing
Perhaps the easiest use of agriculture and PV is allowing sheep to graze under solar panels. The sheep control vegetation, which would otherwise shade the PV. Sheep even do a more thorough job than lawnmowers as they can reach around the legs of the structures. In return, sheep or goats receive forage and a shady place to rest. Sheep may be cheaper than mowing. In general PV system operators pay shepherds to transport sheep.  Experimental sheep agrivoltaics found lower herbage mass available in solar pastures was offset by higher forage quality, resulting in similar spring lamb production to open pastures. Agrivoltaics also can be used to shade cows. Solar grazing is extremely popular in the U.S. and an organization has formed to support it.

Effects
The solar panels of agrivoltaics remove light and space from the crops, but they also affect crops and land they cover in more ways. Two possible effects are water and heat.

In northern latitude climates, agrivoltaics are expected to change the microclimate for crops in both positive and negative manners with no net benefit, reducing quality by increasing humidity and disease, and requiring a higher expenditure on pesticides, but mitigating temperature fluctuations and thus increasing yields. In countries with low or unsteady precipitation, high temperature fluctuation and fewer opportunities for artificial irrigation, such systems are expected to beneficially affect the quality of the microclimate.

Water
In experiments testing evaporation levels under solar panels for shade resistant crops cucumbers and lettuce watered by irrigation in a California desert, a 14–29% savings in evaporation was found, and similar research in the Arizona desert demonstrated water savings of 50% for certain crops.

Heat
A study was done on the heat of the land, air and crops under solar panels for a growing season. It was found that while the air beneath the panels stayed consistent, the land and plants had lower temperatures recorded.

Advantages

Dual use in land for agriculture and energy production could alleviate competition for land resources and allow for less pressure to convert natural areas into more farmland or to develop farmland or natural areas into solar farms.
Initial simulations performed in a paper by Dupraz et al. in 2011, where the word 'agrivoltaics' was first coined, calculated that the land use efficiency may increase by 60–70% (mostly in terms of usage of solar irradiance). The central socio-political opportunities of agrivoltaics include income diversification for farmers, enhanced community relations and acceptance for PV developers, and energy demand and emissions reduction for the global population.

A large advantage of agrivoltaics is that it can overcome NIMBYism for PV systems, which has been becoming an issue. A U.S. survey study assessed if public support for solar development increases when energy and agricultural production are combined in an agrivoltaic system and found 81.8% of respondents would be more likely to support solar development in their community if it integrated agricultural production.

Dinesh et al.'s model claims that the value of solar generated electricity coupled to shade-tolerant crop production created an over 30% increase in economic value from farms deploying agrivoltaic systems instead of conventional agriculture. 
Agrivoltaics may be beneficial for summer crops due to the microclimate they create and the side effect of heat and water flow control. Agrivoltaics is environmentally superior to conventional agriculture or PV systems; a life cycle analysis study found the pasture-based agrivoltaic system features a dual synergy that consequently produces 69.3% less greenhouse gas emissions and demands 82.9% less fossil energy compared to non-integrated production.

Increased crop yield has been shown for a number of crops:

 Basil

 Broccoli
 Celery
 Chiltepin peppers
 Corn/maize
 Lettuce
 Pasture grass
 Potatoes
 Spinach
 Tomatoes
 Wheat

Disadvantages
A disadvantage often cited as an important factor in photovoltaics in general is the substitution of food-producing farmland with solar panels. Cropland is the type of land on which solar panels are the most efficient. Despite allowing for some agriculture to occur on the solar power plant, agrivoltaics may be accompanied by in drop in production. Although some crops in some situations, such as lettuce in California, do not appear to be affected by shading in terms of yield, some land will be sacrificed for mounting structures and systems equipment.

Agrivoltaics will only work well for plants that require shade and where sunlight is not a limiting factor. Shade crops represent only a tiny percentage of agricultural productivity.For instance, wheat crops do not fare well in a low light environment and are not compatible with agrivoltaics.

Agrivoltaic greenhouses are inefficient; in one study, greenhouses with half of the roof covered in panels were simulated, and the resulting crop output reduced by 64% and panel productivity reduced by 84%.

A study identified barriers to adoption of agrivoltaics among farmers, that include: (i) desired certainty of long-term land productivity, (ii) market potential, (iii) just compensation and (iv) a need for predesigned system flexibility to accommodate different scales, types of operations, and changing farming practices.

Agrivoltaics require a large investment, not only in the solar arrays, but in different farming machinery and electrical infrastructure. The potential for farm machinery to damage the infrastructure can also drive up insurance premiums as opposed to conventional solar arrays. In Germany, the high mounting costs could make such systems difficult to finance for farmers based on convention farming loans, but it is possible that in the future governmental regulations, market changes and subsidies may create a new market for investors in such schemes, potentially giving future farmers completely different financing opportunities.

Photovoltaic systems are technologically complex, meaning farmers will be unable to fix some things that may break down or be damaged, and requiring a sufficient pool of professionals. In the case of Germany the average increase in labour costs due to agrivoltaic systems are expected to be around 3%. Allowing sheep to graze among the solar panels may be an attractive option to extract extra agriculture usage from conventional solar arrays, but there may not be enough shepherds available.

Economics 
The shade produced by system located on top of crops can reduce production of some crops, but such losses may be offset by the energy produced. Many experimental plots have been installed by various organisations around the world, but no such systems are known to be commercially viable outside China and Japan. 

The most important factor in the economic viability of agrivoltaics is the cost of installing the photovoltaic panels. It is calculated that in Germany, the subsidising of such projects' electricity generation by a bit more than 300% (feed-in tariffs (FITs)) can make agrivoltaic systems cost-effective for investors and thus may be part of the future mix of electricity generation.

The photovoltaic industry cannot make use of European CAP subsidies when building on agricultural land.

History 
Adolf Goetzberger, founder of the Fraunhofer Institute in 1981, together with Armin Zastrow, theorised about dual usage of arable land for solar energy production and plant cultivation in 1982, which would address the problem of competition for the use of arable land between solar energy production and crops. The light saturation point is the maximum amount of photons absorbable by a plant species: more photons will not increase the rate of photosynthesis (see also photorespiration). Recognising this, Akira Nagashima also suggested combining photovoltaic (PV) systems and farming to use the excess light, and developed the first prototypes in Japan in 2004.

The term "agrivoltaic" may have been used for the first time in a 2011 publication. The concept has been called "agrophotovoltaics" in a German report, and a term translating as "solar sharing" has been used in Japanese. Facilities such as photovoltaic greenhouses can be considered agrivoltaic systems.

In Europe in the early 2000s, experimental photovoltaic greenhouses have been built, with part of the greenhouse roof replaced by solar panels. In Austria, a small experimental open field agrivoltaic system was built in 2007, followed by two experiments in Italy. Experiments in France and Germany then followed.

Agrivoltaics in the world

Austria 
In 2004 Günter Czaloun proposed a photovoltaic tracking system with a rope rack system. The first prototype was built in South Tyrol in 2007 on a 0.1 ha area. The cable structure is more than five meters above the surface. A new system was presented at the Intersolar 2017 conference in Munich. This technology may potentially be less expensive than other open field systems because it requires less steel.

Belgium 
A pilot project was initiated in Belgium in 2020, which will test if it is viable to cultivate pear trees among solar panels.

Canada 
Agrivolatics has started in Canada. Between a quarter (vertical bifacial PV) and more than one third (single-axis tracking PV) of Canada’s electrical energy needs can be provided solely by agrivoltaics using only 1% of current agricultural lands. Several policies are needed to overcome regulatory barriers in Alberta and Ontario to support the rapid deployment of agrivoltaics in Canada. A non profit, Agrivoltaics Canada, has formed to keep Canada’s farmers farming. The Ivey Business School ran the first agrivoltaic conference in Canada in 2022. The Canadian PV company Heliene commercialized greenhouse integrated PV.

Chile 
Three 13 kWp agro-photovoltaic systems were built in Chile in 2017. The goal of this project, supported by the Metropolitan Region of Santiago, was to study the plants that can benefit from the shading of the agrivoltaic system. The electricity produced was used to power agricultural facilities: cleaning, packaging and cold storage of agricultural production, incubator for eggs ... One of the systems was installed in a region with a lot of power outages.

China 
Chinese companies have developed several GWs of solar power plants combining agriculture and solar energy production, either photovoltaic greenhouses or open-field installations. 

For 30 years, the Elion Group has been trying to combat desertification in the Kubuqi region. Among the techniques used, agrivoltaic systems were installed to protect crops and produce electricity. Wan You-Bao received a patent in 2007 for shade system equipment to protect crops in the desert. The shades are equipped with solar panels.

Croatia 
In 2017 a structure was installed with a 500 kWp open field power plant near Virovitica-Podravina. The agronomic studies are supported by the University of Osijek and the agricultural engineering school of Slatina. The electricity production is used for the irrigation system and agricultural machinery. At first crops requiring shade will be tested under the device.

Denmark 
The Agronomy Department of the Aarhus University has launched a study project of agrivoltaic system on orchards in 2014.

France 
Since the beginning of the 2000s, photovoltaic greenhouses have been experimentally built in France. The company Akuo Energy has been developing their concept of agrinergie since 2007. Their first power plants consisted of alternation of crops and solar panels. The new power plants are greenhouses. In 2017 the Tenergie company began the deployment of photovoltaic greenhouses with an architecture that diffuses light in order to reduce the contrasts between light bands and shade bands created by solar panels.

Since 2009, INRA, IRSTEA and Sun'R have been working on the Sun'Agri program. A first prototype installed in the field with fixed panels is built in 2009 on a surface of 0.1 ha in Montpellier. Other prototypes with 1-axis mobile panels were built in 2014 and 2017. The aim of these studies is to manage the microclimate received by plants and to produce electricity, by optimizing the position of the panels. and to study how radiation is distributed between crops and solar panels. The first agrivoltaic plant in the open field of Sun'R is built in the spring of 2018 in Tresserre in the Pyrénées-Orientales. This plant has a capacity of 2.2 MWp installed on 4.5 ha of vineyards. It will evaluate, on a large scale and in real conditions, the performance of the Sun'Agri system on vineyards.

In 2016, the Agrivolta company specialized on the agrivoltaïcs. After a first prototype built in 2017 in Aix-en-Provence, Agrivolta deployed its system on a plot of the National Research Institute of Horticulture (Astredhor) in Hyères. Agrivolta won several innovation prizes Agrivolta presented its technology at the CES in Las Vegas in 2018.

Germany 
In 2011 the Fraunhofer Institute ISE started to research agrivoltaics. Research continues with the APV-Resola project, which began in 2015 and was scheduled to end in 2020. A first prototype of 194.4 kWp was to be built in 2016 from Hilber Solar (today AgroSolar Europe) on a 0.5 ha site belonging to the Hofgemeinschaft Heggelbach cooperative farm in Herdwangen. As of 2015, photovoltaic power generation is still not economically viable in Germany without governmental FIT subsidies. As of 2021, FITs are not available in Germany for agrovoltaic systems.

India 
Projects for isolated sites are being studied by Amity University in Noida, northern India. A study published in 2017 looked at the potential of agrivoltaics for vineyards in India. The agrivoltaic system studied in this article consist of solar panels intercalated between crops to limit shading on plants. This study claimed that the system could increase the revenue (not profit) of Indian farmers in one specific area by 1500% (ignoring investment costs).

In December 2021 Cochin International Airport Limited with the airport's agrivoltaic farming scaled up to 20 acres became the largest of its kind in the country

Italy 
In 2009 and 2011, agrivoltaic systems with fixed panels were installed above vineyards. Experiments showed a slight decrease of the yield and late harvests.

In 2009 the Italian company REM TEC developed a dual-axis solar tracking system. In 2011 and 2012, REM TEC built several MW of open field agrivoltaic power plants. The solar panels are installed 5 m above the ground to operate agricultural machinery. The shadow due to the cover of photovoltaic panels claimed to be less than 15%, so as to minimize its effect on the crops. The company advertises as being the first to offer "automated integrated shading net systems into the supporting structure". REM TEC has also designed a dual-axis solar tracking systems integrated into the greenhouse structure. According to the company website, control of the position of the solar panels would optimize the greenhouse microclimate.

More recently, the Italian National Agency for New Technologies, Energy and Sustainable Economic Developmenent (ENEA) launched the national network for sustainable agrivoltaic systems as part of the "Green revolution and ecological transition" mission of the National Recovery and Resilience Plan. According to a study conducted by ENEA and Università Cattolica del Sacro Cuore, the economic and environmental performances of agrivoltaic systems are similar to those of ground photovoltaic plants. ENEA's objective is to increase installed power by 30GW.  For ENEA, 0.32% of Italian agricultural fields are to be covered by photovoltaic systems in order to reach 50% of the objectives of the national energy plan.

Japan 
Japan was the first country to develop of open field agrivoltaics when in 2004 Akira Nagashima developed a demountable structure that he tested on several crops. Removable structures allow farmers to remove or move facilities based on crop rotations and their needs. A number of larger facilities with permanent structures and dynamic systems, and with capacities of several MW, have since been developed. A 35 MW power plant, installed on 54 ha, started operation in 2018. It consists of panels two metres above the ground at their lowest point, mounted on steel piles in a concrete foundation. The shading rate of this plant is over 50%, a value higher than the 30% shading usually found in the Nagashima systems. Under the panels farmers will cultivate ginseng, ashitaba and coriander in plastic tunnels; ginseng was selected because it requires deep shape. The area was previously used to grow lawn grass for golf courses, but due to golf becoming less popular in Japan, the farming land had begun to be abandoned. A proposal for a solar power plant of 480 MW to be built on the island of Ukujima, part of which would be agrivoltaics, was tendered in 2013. The construction was supposed to begin in 2019.

To obtain permission to exploit solar panels over crops, Japanese law requires farmers to maintain at least 80% of agricultural production. Farmers must remove panels if the municipality finds that they are shading out too much cropland. At the same time, the Japanese government gives out high subsidies, known as FITs, for local energy production, which allows landowners, using the rather flimsy and light-weight systems, to generate much more revenue from energy production than farming.

Malaysia 

In Malaysia, Cypark Resources Berhad (Cypark), Malaysia's largest developer of renewable energy projects had in 2014 commissioned Malaysia's first Agriculture Integrated Photo Voltaic (AIPV) Solar Farm in Kuala Perlis. The AIPV combines a 1MW solar installation with agriculture activities on 5 acres of land. The AIPV produces, among other things, melons, chillies, cucumbers which are sold at the local market.

Cypark later developed other four other solar farms integrated with agriculture activities: 6MW in Kuala Perlis with sheep and goat rearing, 425KW in Pengkalan Hulu with local vegetables, and 4MW in Jelebu and 11MW in Tanah Merah with sheep and goats.

The Universiti Putra Malaysia, which specializes in agronomy, launched experiments in 2015 on plantations of Orthosiphon stamineus, a medicinal herb often called Java tea in English. It is a fixed structure installed on an experimental surface of about 0.4 ha.

South Korea 
Agrivoltaic is one of the solutions studied to increase the share of renewable energies in Korea's energy mix. The South Korean government has adopted the Plan 3020 for energy policy, with the goal to have 20% of the energy supply based on renewable resources by 2030, against 5% in 2017. In 2019 Korea Agrivoltaic Association was established to promote and develop South Korea's agrivoltaic industry. SolarFarm.Ltd built the first agrivoltaic power plant in South Korea in 2016 and has produced rice.

South Korea has very little agricultural land compared to most nations. National zoning laws, called separation regulations, made it illegal to build solar farms near roads or residential areas, but meant that solar farms must be installed on otherwise unproductive mountain slopes, where they were hard to access and have been destroyed during storms. In 2017 the separation rules were revised, allowing counties to formulate their own regulations. A number of agrivoltaic plants have been installed since then. The expansion of photovoltaic plants throughout the countryside has enraged local residents and inspired a number of protests, as the panels are considered an eyesore, and people fear pollution by toxic materials used in the panels, or danger from "electromagnetic waves". Resistance by disgruntled locals to the industry has led to countless legal battles throughout the country. Kim Chang-han, executive secretariat of the Korea Agrivoltaic Association, claims that the problems in the industry are caused by "Fake News".

The German Fraunhofer Institute claimed in 2021 that the South Korean government is planning to build 100,000 agrivoltaic systems on farms as a retirement provision for farmers.

United States 
In the United States, SolAgra is interested in the concept in collaboration with the Department of Agronomy at the University of California at Davis. A first power plant on 0.4 ha is under development. An area of 2.8 ha is used as a control. Several types of crops are studied: alfalfa, sorghum, lettuce, spinach, beets, carrots, chard, radishes, potatoes, arugula, mint, turnips, kale, parsley, coriander, beans, peas, shallots and mustard. Projects for isolated sites are also studied. Experimental systems are being studied by several universities: the Biosphere 2 project at the University of Arizona, the Stockbridge School of Agriculture project (University of Massachusetts at Amherst). Jack's Solar Garden in Colorado grows vegetables under an array of 3,200 solar panels. One US energy company is installing beehives near its existing solar array.

Vietnam 
Fraunhofer ISE has deployed their agrivoltaic system on a shrimp farm located in Bac Liêu in the Mekong Delta. According to this institute, the results of their pilot project indicate that water consumption has been reduced by 75%. Their system might offer other benefits such as shading for workers as well as a lower and stable water temperature for better shrimp growth.

See also
 Growth of photovoltaics

References

External links
 American Solar Grazing Association
 Conference

Agriculture
Solar energy